The Roman bridge of Lugo crosses the Minho river in Lugo, Galicia. The bridg, which is a bridge of Roman origin, has been rebuilt many times in its history.

The bridge was open to traffic until 2012. It was then closed to all vehicles and converted to a pedestrian only footbridge. The roadway and modern superstructure was replaced with contemporary stonework to compliment the bridge's original features.

Gallery

See also
Roman walls of Lugo
List of Roman sites in Spain

References

External links

Stone bridges in Spain
Roman bridges in Spain
Lugo